Kúnlé is a male Yoruba given name, meaning "to fill the house." It is normally a diminutive of longer names like "Olukunle" (The Lord fills the house) or "Adekunle" (Royalty fills the house), "Fákúnlé" (Ifa has filled the house), and others. Notable people with the given name include:

Kunle Adejuyigbe (born 1977), Nigerian sprinter
Kunle Afolayan (born 1974), Nigerian actor, film producer and director
Kunle Ajayi (born 1964), Nigerian gospel singer, songwriter, saxophonist and televangelist
Kunle Ajibade (born 1958), Nigerian journalist, editor and author
Kunle Dada-Luke (born 2000), Canadian footballer 
Kunle Filani (born 1957), Nigerian educator and artist
Kunle Olukotun, American electrical engineer
Kunle Remi, Nigerian actor
Kunle Adeyanju, Nigerian professional motorcyclist.